Lisbeth Grönfeldt Bergman (born 1948), is a Swedish politician of the Moderate Party. She has been a member of the Riksdag since 2006. She was Member of the European Parliament (MEP) from 1999 to 2004.

External links 
Lisbeth Grönfeldt Bergman at the Riksdag website

1948 births
Living people
Members of the Riksdag from the Moderate Party
Women members of the Riksdag
Moderate Party MEPs
MEPs for Sweden 1999–2004
20th-century women MEPs for Sweden
21st-century women MEPs for Sweden